Better Get Ready is the debut studio album by American Hasidic punk band Moshiach Oi!. The album, produced by guitarist Mike Wagner and mastered by Don Fury, was released on June 20, 2009 through Shemspeed Records and the band's own Shabasa Records.

Reception
Emily Savage of Jweekly described the album as "Simple, straight-forward, unabashed scroll-loving lyrics. All yelled at maximum volume of course." Alex Suskind of The Forward said, "Moshiach Oi! has found a divine balance of religion and rock [and] uses the traditional punk sound of raucous guitars and boisterous vocals to explore Jewish ideals and values." Patrick Aleph of Jewcy summarized Better Get Ready as "a blistering punk rock siddurim that effortlessly ties together Black Flag and Rambam, 7 Seconds and the Rebbe, The Casualties and the Kabballists."

Track listing

Personnel

Moshiach Oi!
Yishai Romanoff – lead vocals, guitar, drums
Mike Wagner – guitar, vocals
Mitchell "Mordechai" Harrison – bass guitar, vocals
Paul Alpert – drums on "I Love Torah" and "Moshiach Oi!"

Other
Mike Wagner – producer, engineering, mixing
Don Fury – mastering
Rabbi Moshe Wilkominsky – spoken word intro on "Shabbos"
Gavriel Saks – synth on "I Love Torah"
Linda Miriam – screaming on "Shabbos"
Ahron Moeller – art direction
Erez Safar – cover design
Breeah Berezin-Bahr – cover photography

References 

2009 debut albums
Moshiach Oi! albums